Gnathopogon caerulescens is a species of ray-finned fish in the genus Gnathopogon endemic to Lake Biwa in Japan.

References

Gnathopogon
Cyprinid fish of Asia
Freshwater fish of Japan
Fish described in 1883